Bazaar Bazaar is the debut album by the Raleigh, North Carolina-based rock band Birds of Avalon. The album was released by Volcom Entertainment on May 22, 2007.

Track listing
 "Bicentennial Baby" 3:46
 "Horse Called Dust" 3:26
 "Instant Coma" 2:12
 "Set You Free" 5:28
 "Wanderlust" 2:03
 "Taking Trains" 3:24
 "Superpower" 4:03
 "Where's My Blood?" 1:49
 "Turn Gold" 3:54
 "Think" 5:45
 "Lost Pages from the Robot Repair Manual" 5:38

References 

2007 debut albums
Birds of Avalon albums
Volcom Entertainment albums